Steknica is a PKP railway station in Steknica (Pomeranian Voivodeship), Poland.

Lines crossing the station

References 
Steknica article at Polish Stations Database, URL accessed at 18 March 2006

Railway stations in Pomeranian Voivodeship
Lębork County